Səpnəkəran (also, Sapnakeran and Sapnaperan) is a village and municipality in the Lankaran Rayon of Azerbaijan.  It has a population of 1,481.

References 

Populated places in Lankaran District